Simon Culhane (born 10 March 1968 in Invercargill, New Zealand) is a former rugby union player who won six caps playing at fly-half for the New Zealand rugby union side (the All Blacks).

Culhane made his international test debut at the age of 27 on 4 June 1995 during the 1995 Rugby World Cup. The match, against Japan was won 145-17 and is the largest winning margin for an All Blacks side. Culhane amassed 45 points during his debut, a world record for first class test rugby that still stands today, slotting 20 of 21 conversion attempts and scoring a try. He lost his place in the starting line-up for the next match to first-choice Andrew Mehrtens. He then went on to win just five more caps. He currently coaches Rugby Southland in the New Zealand National Provincial Championship.

He also played cricket for Southland in the Hawke Cup.

References

External links
Simon Culhane on Sporting Heroes
 

1968 births
Cambridge R.U.F.C. players
Living people
New Zealand international rugby union players
Rugby union fly-halves
Southland rugby union players
Otago rugby union players
Highlanders (rugby union) players
Rugby union players from Invercargill
People educated at Aurora College (Invercargill)